March of the Siamese Children is an album by jazz musician Frank Strozier, recorded in 1962 for Jazzland.

Track listing 
"March of the Siamese Children" (Rodgers, Hammerstein II)5:10
"Extension 27" (Strozier)4:57
"Something I Dreamed Last Night" (Fain, Magidson, Yellen)5:21
"Don't Follow the Crowd" (Bill Lee)4:58
"Our Waltz" (David Rose)5:33
"Will I Forget?" (Strozier)5:32
"Lap" (Lee)3:35
"Hey, Lee!" (Mabern)4:35

Personnel 
 Frank Strozieralto sax, flute (1, 6)
 Harold Mabernpiano
 Bill Leebass
 Al Drearesdrums

References 

1962 albums
Albums produced by Orrin Keepnews
Riverside Records albums
Frank Strozier albums